Ilya Olegovich Vakhrushev (born 3 May 1989) is a former Russian professional footballer.

Club career
He played in the Russian Football National League for FC Zvezda Irkutsk in 2008.

He made his only appearance for the senior squad of FC Tom Tomsk on 15 July 2009 in a Russian Cup game against FC Alania Vladikavkaz.

External links
 
 
 

1989 births
Living people
Russian footballers
Association football defenders
FC Zvezda Irkutsk players
FC Tom Tomsk players
FC Baikal Irkutsk players